Calofulcinia is a genus of praying mantises in the family Nanomantidae.

Species
Calofulcinia australis
Calofulcinia elegans
Calofulcinia integra
Calofulcinia oxynota
Calofulcinia paraoxypila
Calofulcinia vidua
Calofulcinia viridula

References

Nanomantidae
Mantodea genera
Taxa named by Ermanno Giglio-Tos